The 1976 Oklahoma State Cowboys football team represented Oklahoma State University during the 1976 NCAA Division I football season. Running back Terry Miller had 1,714 rushing yards on 291 attempts, averaging 5.9 yards per attempt, and 23 touchdowns. Miller finished fourth in the Heisman Trophy voting.

Schedule

Roster
QB Charlie Weatherbie, Sr.
RB Terry Miller, Sr.

After the season

The 1977 NFL Draft was held on May 3–4, 1977. The following Cowboys were selected.

References

Oklahoma State
Oklahoma State Cowboys football seasons
Big Eight Conference football champion seasons
Citrus Bowl champion seasons
Oklahoma State Cowboys football